Group A of UEFA Euro 2020 took place from 11 to 20 June 2021 in Baku's Olympic Stadium and Rome's Stadio Olimpico. The group contained Turkey, host nation and eventual champions Italy, Wales and Switzerland.

Teams

Notes

Standings

In the round of 16,
The winner of Group A, Italy, advanced to play the runner-up of Group C, Austria.
The runner-up of Group A, Wales, advanced to play the runner-up of Group B, Denmark.
The third-placed team of Group A, Switzerland, advanced as one of the four best third-placed teams to play the winner of Group F, France.

Matches

Turkey vs Italy

Wales vs Switzerland

Turkey vs Wales

Italy vs Switzerland

Switzerland vs Turkey

Italy vs Wales

Discipline
Fair play points were to be used as a tiebreaker if the head-to-head and overall records of teams were tied (and if a penalty shoot-out was not applicable as a tiebreaker). These were calculated based on yellow and red cards received in all group matches as follows:
yellow card = 1 point
red card as a result of two yellow cards = 3 points
direct red card = 3 points
yellow card followed by direct red card = 4 points

Only one of the above deductions was applied to a player in a single match.

References

External links

Group A overview at UEFA.com

UEFA Euro 2020
Turkey at UEFA Euro 2020
Italy at UEFA Euro 2020
Wales at UEFA Euro 2020
Switzerland at UEFA Euro 2020